The St. Anne's Society is a Catholic support group for women in the United States. It was founded in 1881 by Anna Wick as the St. Anne's Mother's Society. Its purpose is to provide an opportunity for families to assist parish programs, to be involved in spiritual, educational. Encourage women blessed with the gift of motherhood to fulfill their vocation with the, humility, dignity and love of St. Anne.

St. Anne's Society is active in almost every Catholic parish of Polonia in the United States.

Anna means "grace". St. Anne is the patroness of mothers, pregnant women, widows, sailors, poor schools, and Christians.

The St. Anne's Society 
 Aurora, IL - Holy Angels Parish
 Galveston, TX - Holy Family Parish
 Gloucester, England - St. Anne Society of Gloucester
 Greenville, SC  - St. Joseph's Catholic School
 Harbor Springs, Michigan - Holy Childhood of Jesus Parish
 High Hill, TX  - St. Mary Parish
 Houston, TX - St. Vincent de Paul Parish
 Monona, WI - Immaculate Heart of Mary Parish
 Woodlands, TX - St. Anthony of Padua Parish
 New Castle, IN - St. Anne Parish

References

External links 

 St. Anne's Society - St. John Vianney

Anne's Society
Anne's Society